Madison Southern High School is a public high school located in Berea, Kentucky, United States. The school mascot is the Eagles, with the school colors being orange and navy blue.

It is one of four high schools in Madison County, Kentucky and one of two high schools in the Madison County School System.

References

External links
Official website

Schools in Madison County, Kentucky
Public high schools in Kentucky